This is a list of the Iceland national football team results from 2000 to 2019. Only games against full national sides are counted.

2000

2001

2002

2003

2004

2005

2006

2007

2008

2009

2010

2011

2012

2013

2014

2015

2016

2017

2018

2019

References

Iceland national football team
2000s in Icelandic sport
2010s in Icelandic sport
Iceland national football team results